Pershing Square Capital Management is an American hedge fund management company founded and run by Bill Ackman, headquartered in New York City.

Company history

In 2004, with $54 million in funding from his personal funds and former business partner Leucadia National, Ackman started Pershing Square Capital Management.

Ackman has been known to hire people outside of traditional finance backgrounds; for instance, his professionals have included a former fly fishing guide, a former tennis pro, and "a man whom he met in a cab."

In October 2014, Ackman launched a UK-based closed-end fund, Pershing Square Holdings, on the London Stock Exchange.

Investment history
Pershing has launched activist campaigns against McDonald's, Wendy's, and Herbalife.

In 2005, Pershing bought a significant share in fast food chain Wendy's International and successfully pressured them to sell off its Tim Horton's donut chain. Wendy's spun off the Canadian restaurant donut chain through an IPO in 2006 and raised $670 million for Wendy's investors. After Ackman sold his shares at a substantial profit after a dispute over executive succession, the stock price collapsed, raising criticism the sale of Wendy's fastest growing unit left the company in a weaker market position. Ackman blamed the poor performance on their new CEO.

In December 2007, his funds owned a 10% stake in Target Corporation, valued at $4.2 billion through the purchase of stock and derivatives. His funds now own a 7.8% stake.

On January 9, 2009, the fund disclosed a 7.4% ownership stake in General Growth Properties (GGP) according to documents filed with the SEC, becoming the second-largest shareholder behind Brookfield Asset Management. The fund was betting on the company going bankrupt in such a way as to leave its shareholders intact. In November 2010, Pershing Square helped the company emerge from Chapter 11 bankruptcy protection. As of August 2012 the fund held beneficial ownership of 7.7 percent of General Growth's stock.

In 2010, Pershing Square reported having taken large ownership stakes in JC Penney and Canadian Pacific Railway.

In July 2012, Ackman acknowledged to CNBC he had acquired shares in Procter & Gamble worth approximately $1.8 billion, a 1% stake in the company, with the idea of taking an activist role within the corporation. Pershing Square later reduced its stake in Procter & Gamble, which was valued at around $60 million by the end of 2013.

In the first quarter of 2016, the hedge fund experienced its "biggest-ever quarterly loss" of 25%,  due in part to its 9% stake in Valeant Pharmaceuticals International. Ackman, who joined Valeant's board in March 2016, commented on the company's 88% loss since August 2015 stating, “This is going to be a badly scraped knee that may even require stitches but it is not life threatening... We should be able to recover the lion's share of our investment—if not all of it—over time". After the controversial drug prices and operations of Valeant became public, Ackman and Valeant's board fired former CEO Mike Pearson, and Pershing Square sold all of its stake in Valeant with a total loss of $4bn.

In September 2016, Pershing Square continued its investment in fast food by buying a 9.9% stake in Chipotle Mexican Grill. As of March 2018, Pershing Square held a 10.3% stake in Chipotle.
In 2018, Ackman dumped $500 million into the publicly traded arm of Pershing Square Capital Management stating it was significantly undervalued at roughly $15 a share. As of September 2019, the fund returned 54.5% with a share price of $19.10, the highest since January 2016.

In March 2020,  Pershing Square made $2.6bn (£2.2bn) betting that there would be a market crash.

In November 2020,  Pershing Square took a position against corporate credit.

In April 2022, Pershing Square lost in excess of $430mn on Netflix after a three month long bet.

Herbalife

In December 2012, Ackman announced the firm had made a $1 billion short bet against Herbalife, a maker of weight-loss and vitamin supplements, calling the company a "pyramid scheme". After activist billionaire investor Carl Icahn bought a stake in the company in January 2013, the share price rose nearly 13% and the investment was seen by analysts as the worst investment ever made by the firm. After a persistent political and grassroots campaign funded by Ackman and the firm, the Federal Trade Commission initiated a civil investigation into Herbalife, causing its stock to drop enough that by March 2014, Pershing Square was nearly even on their bet. In April 2014, Reuters reported that, according to its sources, the FBI conducted a probe into Herbalife and reviewed documents obtained from the company's former distributors.

In March 2015, U.S. District Judge Dale Fischer dismissed a suit filed by Herbalife investors alleging the company is operating an illegal pyramid scheme. On March 12, 2015, it reported that Ackman was under investigation by federal prosecutors and the FBI; Ackman was quoted that he would not back down from his claims against Herbalife.

Platform Specialty Products Corporation
As of June 2014, Pershing Square is the largest institutional holder of the shares of Platform Specialty Products Corporation, owning a 24.28% stake. Pershing first disclosed the position in January 2014, shortly after Platform debuted on the New York Stock Exchange.  Subsequently, in April 2014, Platform announced a deal to acquire the agrochemicals business of Chemtura for approximately $1 billion. Agriphar, another agricultural specialty chemicals company, agreed in August 2014 to become the third company to join the Platform umbrella.

In April 2014, Ackman singled out Platform Specialty Products in "The Outsider" presentation, which discusses optimal methods of capital allocation.

Pershing Square Tontine Holdings (PSTH) 
Pershing Square Tontine Holdings is a blank check company formed by Bill Ackman that went public in July 22, 2020 at a value of $4 billion and trade under the ticker symbol PSTH.U before the split of its warrants and shares. PSTH is currently the largest SPAC to IPO to date.

PSTH has a unique "Tontine" structure where shareholders are incentivized to hold shares through merger once a target is found for acquisition. The IPO included 200 million units, which included a total of 200 million shares and 22,222,222 warrants. Another 44,444,444 warrants, or two ninths per share, will be distributed to shareholders who choose to participate in the proposed merger. The strike price of PSTH warrants are $23.

In July 2022, Ackman addressed PSTH shareholders saying that he would return the funds of the SPAC as he was "unable to consummate a transaction that both meets our investment criteria and is executable."

In popular culture 
Pershing Square's investment ventures are prominently featured in two financial documentaries.

 Betting on Zero features Bill Ackman's economic activism in the $1Bn shorting of Herbalife Nutrition by Pershing in a positive light, highlighting the costly lengths to which the fund went in trying to prove the allegation that the multi-level marketing company was in fact a pyramid scheme.
 The "Drug Short" episode of Dirty Money shine a more doubtful light on Ackman's decision to double down on the fund's Valeant investments until the forced departure of former CEO Mike Pearson.

Further reading

External links
Pershing Square Capital Management
Pershing Square Challenge
Ackman's Pershing Square takes big stakes in Freddie, Fannie
Ackman's Pershing Square Takes $1.2 Billion Hit

References
 

Hedge fund firms in New York City
Investment companies of the United States
Financial services companies established in 2004
Hedge funds